Shardlow Hall is a 17th-century former country house at Shardlow, Derbyshire now in use as commercial offices. It is a Grade II* listed building which is officially listed on the Buildings at Risk Register.

The house was built in 1684 for Leonard Fosbrooke,  originally to an H-plan design with two storeys with parapets and a six-bay entrance front. A series of six Leonard Fosbrookes succeeded to the estate, two of whom served as High Sheriff of Derbyshire. A new seven-bayed west garden front was constructed in 1726, and in the late 18th century the entrance front was extended by the creation of single-storey wings, each terminating in a pedimented two-storey pavilion.

The Fosbrookes moved to Ravenstone Hall and in 1826 sold the house to James Sutton of Shardlow, High Sheriff of Derbyshire in 1842.

The house ceased use as a residence and was occupied by Shardlow Hall School from 1911 to 1933.

More recently it has been used as commercial offices.

See also
Listed buildings in Shardlow and Great Wilne

References

Grade II* listed buildings in Derbyshire
Structures on the Heritage at Risk register
History of Derbyshire
1684 establishments in England